Liubymivka is an urban-type settlement in Kakhovka Raion, Kherson Oblast, southern Ukraine. It is adjacent to the city of Kakhovka and is located on the left bank of the Dnieper, which is dammed there creating the Kakhovka Reservoir. Liubymivka hosts the administration of Liubymivka settlement hromada, one of the hromadas of Ukraine. It has a population of

Economy

Transportation
Liubymivka is on the railway connecting Mykolaiv via Snihurivka and Nova Kakhovka with Melitopol. There is infrequent passenger traffic.

The settlement has access to Highway M14 connecting Kherson with Melitopol.

See also 

 Russian occupation of Kherson Oblast

References

Urban-type settlements in Kakhovka Raion
Populated places on the Dnieper in Ukraine